George Engebretson (June 3, 1890 - November 19, 1961) was a member of the Wisconsin State Senate.

Biography
Engebretson was born in Warren, Illinois. He later moved with his family to Wiota, Wisconsin and attended the University of Wisconsin-Platteville. He was a farmer and insurance agent. Engebretson died  in a hospital in Monroe, Wisconsin.

Career
Engebretson was elected to the Senate representing the 17th district as a Republican in 1932. He was defeated for re-election in 1938 as a member of the Wisconsin Progressive Party.

Family
His father was Julius M. Engebretson who served in the Wisconsin State Assembly.

References

People from Warren, Illinois
People from Wiota, Wisconsin
Republican Party Wisconsin state senators
Wisconsin Progressives (1924)
University of Wisconsin–Platteville alumni
Businesspeople from Wisconsin
Farmers from Wisconsin
1890 births
1961 deaths
20th-century American politicians
American people of Norwegian descent
20th-century American businesspeople